Samyeongdang (1544–1610), also known by his dharma name Yujeong, was a Korean Buddhist monk during the Joseon era. He is sometimes identified by his pen name, Song-un.  He was born to a family of the Im clan in Miryang, Gyeongsang Province. After the deaths of his mother in 1558 and his father in 1559, he became a monk at Jikjisa on Hwangaksan in Gimcheon.

Life
In 1561, he passed the seon-gwa, the specialized gwageo (civil service examinations) for Buddhist monks. He corresponded with various scholars of the time including Pak Saam, Heo Hagok, and Im Baekho.  In 1575, he was recommended as head of the Seon order, but refused and instead traveled to Myohyangsan. There he was instructed by preceptor Hyujeong.  He went on to pass three years at Bodeoksa on Mount Kumgang, and later traveled through Palgongsan, Cheongnyangsan, and Taebaeksan.

With the start of the Japanese invasions of Korea (1592–98) in 1592, Yujeong joined his teacher Hyujeong's righteous army of monks. After Hyujeong retired due to his age, Yujeong took over the leadership of the army. He led the army into battles at Pyongyang and Uiryeong County in 1592, set up mountain fortresses through Gyeongsang in 1594, and joined in battle again at Ulsan and Suncheon.

In 1604, after the end of the war, he traveled to Japan on Seonjo of Joseon's orders to forge a peace accord with Tokugawa Ieyasu, and returned with 3500 Koreans who had been taken prisoner. Yujeong's diplomatic missions established a resilient foundation for a series of major Joseon missions to Japan.

After his death in 1610 on Haeinsa, Yujeong was enshrined in the Pyochung Seowon in Miryang and at Suchungsa in Nyongbyon.  He continues to be remembered in modern times, with numerous statues and other memorials around Korea. He has been cited together with Hyujeong as an example of a "patriotic-minded" Buddhist by the North Korean Buddhist Federation. Yujeong's writings are preserved in the Samyeongjip and Bunchungseo Nallok.

See also
 List of Joseon Dynasty people
 Military history of Korea

Notes

References
 Kang, Jae-eun and Suzanne Lee. (2006). The Land of Scholars : Two Thousand Years of Korean Confucianism. Paramus, New Jersey: Homa & Sekey Books. ; OCLC 60931394
 Walker, Brett L.  "Foreign Affairs and Frontiers in Early Modern Japan: A Historiographical Essay," Early Modern Japan. Fall, 2002, pp. 44–62, 124-128.

External links
 Samyeongdang Memorial Association
 Empas entry

1544 births
1610 deaths
Joseon Buddhist monks
Korean Buddhist monks
Foreign relations of the Joseon dynasty
16th-century Korean people
Pungcheon Im clan
Seon Buddhist monks
Zen Buddhism writers
Year of death unknown
16th-century Korean philosophers